Drukqs (stylised as drukQs) is the fifth studio album by Aphex Twin, the alias of British  electronic musician Richard D. James, released in 2001 on Warp. It is a double album alternating primarily between tracks of meticulously programmed drum and bass-inspired beats and computer-controlled classical piano pieces. It features the piano composition "Avril 14th," one of James's best-known recordings.

Drukqs was released to a divided reception, with many critics dismissing it as inferior to his earlier works. The album peaked at number 22 on the UK Albums Chart. James would not release another album under the alias Aphex Twin until Syro (2014).

Background
James decided to release Drukqs primarily to circumvent a potential leak after he accidentally left behind an MP3 player containing 180 of his unreleased tracks on a plane while traveling to Scotland with Rephlex co-founder Grant Wilson-Claridge: "I thought, 'They're gonna fucking come on the internet sooner or later so I may as well get an album out of it first.'" He intended it to be his final release as part of his contractual obligation to Warp. About the album's two-disc length, James said "the way I listen to music now is that I buy a CD, put it on the computer and just take the tracks I want anyway. I’d hope that people would do the same with this CD."

Many track names are written in Cornish—for example, "Jynweythek" ("Machine")—or are coded titles. James has stated that the title is not related to drugs, and is "just a word [he] made up"; he added "I never wanted to big up any drugs, because I don't reckon they deserve it."

Music
Drukqs contains tracks dating back "seven or eight years", according to James, though most of the album was relatively new. The LP is a double album featuring roughly two styles: rapid, meticulously-programmed tracks utilizing exaggerated drum 'n' bass breakbeats, and classical piano pieces made using computer-controlled instruments such as a modified Yamaha Disklavier and several MIDI-controlled, solenoid-based drum mechanisms made by James. Keymag described it as "switching restlessly from his most acidic drill 'n' bass yet to incredibly lavish prepared piano pieces inspired by John Cage." NME noted that the album moves through techno, drum 'n' bass, and early-90s rave, while the piano interludes were compared to the work of Erik Satie. Pitchfork also noted "several purely electro-acoustic excursions".

James said that "A lot of [the tracks] are quite old-style sounding, I reckon. I’ve done loads of tracks which are really new in style and which don’t sound like anything else but I didn’t want to release those tracks." While acknowledging similarities with his past records, James said that "I haven’t done something in so much detail before." Of the album's complex drum programming, he said "it's quite similar to guitar solos, only with programming you have to use your brain. The most important thing is that it should have some emotional effect on me, rather than just, 'Oh, that's really clever.'"

In 2015, James released the EP Computer Controlled Acoustic Instruments pt2, featuring further computer-controlled instrumental tracks, as a sequel to Drukqs.

Reception

Drukqs is among James's "most divisive" releases, with Oli Warwick of Crack Magazine noting that it provoked "widespread indignation amongst music critics, whose primary criticism seemed to be that James had delivered something reminiscent of previous releases, rather than some bold new mode of electronic expression." At Metacritic, which assigns a normalised rating out of 100 to reviews from mainstream critics, the album has received an average score of 66, based on 21 reviews.

On its 2001 release Alex Needham of NME called it "beautiful" and "bulging with goodies". For Spin however, Simon Reynolds criticised the album as "unimpressive" and "trapped by the potential for infinitesimal tweakage," stating that it "sounds merely like a slight extension of the Aphex sound circa 1996's Richard D. James Album and 1997's Come to Daddy." Pitchfork described the album's "drill'n'bass" tracks as "throwbacks to the past rather than prospects on the future; and for all of their compositional strength, there's an element of the Aphex Twin mystique missing." Dave Simpson of The Guardian stated that "much of Drukqs sounds like weaker echoes of things Aphex Twin has done before, which no manner of hyperactive drum machines or daft titles can disguise." Pat Blashill of Rolling Stone called Drukqs Aphex's "most irrelevant album to date", and added "rumor has it that James merely loaded this record with outtakes that have been eating up space on his hard drive for years, then released the album as a deal-breaker with his label, Warp." However, in The Rolling Stone Album Guide (2004), critic Sasha Frere-Jones stated that "weirdly dismissed by many, Drukqs is often spectacular".

The piano composition "Avril 14th" became one of James's most popular tracks, later being used in films, a Saturday Night Live skit, and the Kanye West song "Blame Game." As of April 2017, the track was James's most streamed track on Spotify, with approximately 124 million streams. By this metric, it is his best-known composition.

Track listing

CD
All songs composed by Richard D. James.

Vinyl

Notes
 An alternate version of Avril 14th (known as "avril altdelay") was uploaded to James' SoundCloud in 2014.
 Another version of Avril 14th titled "avril 14th doubletempo,half speed" was added as Track 34 on 3 December 2018, but it was removed after some hours.
 Mangle 11 was previously released on the Rephlexions! An Album of Braindance! compilation as "Mangle 11 (Circuit Bent V.I.P. Mix)" by AFX.

Personnel
Aphex Twin – piano, synthesizers, keyboards, harmonium, percussion, programming, treatments, sampler, photographs

Charts

Certifications

References

External links
 Drukqs.net – The official Drukqs Web site: free MP3s and information (Flash Player-enabled browser required for access).
 
 Drukqs at the Warp Records discography
 Drukqs on Discogs

Aphex Twin albums
Warp (record label) albums
Sire Records albums
2001 albums
Works for prepared piano